"I Dig Rock and Roll Music" is a 1967 song by the American folk group Peter, Paul and Mary, written by Paul Stookey, James Mason and Dave Dixon.

Background
Credited to Stookey-Mason-Dixon, the song's lyrics reference contemporary rock artists including the Mamas & the Papas, Donovan, and the Beatles. The song parodies and satirizes the vocal style of the Mamas & the Papas in the first verse, Donovan in the second verse and the Beatles in the third verse. Matthew Greenwald of AllMusic commented that the song "simply celebrates the simple joy of pop music at the time." 

In an interview with the Chicago Daily News in 1966, a year before the song's release, Mary Travers expressed contempt for the emergence of the folk rock genre: "(It's) so badly written. ... When the fad changed from folk to rock, they didn't take along any good writers."

The line "When the words don't get in the way, yeah" and especially the phrasing of "yeah" is a reference to the line "Every other day, every other day, every other day of the week is fine, yeah" from the Mamas & the Papas' song "Monday, Monday".

The line about Donovan and "his crystal images" refers to the mention of "crystal spectacles" in "Epistle to Dippy". The song is also noted for its psychedelic feedback effects, miming the volume swell on the electric guitar from Donovan's 1966 song "Sunshine Superman". The backing vocal effect in the verse, parodying the Beatles, reflects "Yellow Submarine".

Cash Box said the song is "a rollicking trip with a sense of humor."

Chart history
The song was a hit single for the group and reached No. 9 on the Billboard Hot 100.  In Australia, the song reached No. 4.

Weekly charts

Year-end charts

References

External links
 

1967 singles
Peter, Paul and Mary songs
Songs written by Paul Stookey
1967 songs
Warner Records singles
Song recordings produced by Milt Okun
Songs about rock music
Satirical songs